Constable Studer (German: Wachtmeister Studer) is a 1939 Swiss crime film directed by Leopold Lindtberg and starring Heinrich Gretler, Adolf Manz and Anne-Marie Blanc. The film is based on a novel by Friedrich Glauser. It was followed by a sequel Madness Rules in 1947 with Gretler reprising his role.

It was shot at the Rosenhof Studios in Zurich over the summer of 1939.

Synopsis
A policeman is not convinced that the prime suspect in a murder case is realty guilty and so decides to reinvestigate the case, despite the lack of co-operation from locals.

Cast
 Heinrich Gretler as Wachtmeister Jakob Studer / Constable Jakob Studer  
 Adolf Manz as Bürgermeister Aeschbacher / Mayor Aeschbacher  
 Bertha Danegger as Mutter Aeschbacher / Mother Aeschbacher  
 Armin Schweizer as Gottlieb Ellenberger  
 Ellen Widmann as Anastasia Witschi  
 Robert Trösch as Armin Witschi  
 Anne-Marie Blanc as Sonja Witschi  
 Robert Bichler as Erwin Schlumpf  
 Hans Kaes as Polizist Murmann / Police officer Murmann  
 Zarli Carigiet as Schreier  
 Rudolf Bernhard as Schwomm  
 Sigfrit Steiner as Untersuchungsricher Steffen / Examining magistrate Steffen  
 Alfred Lucca as Gerber  
 Rita Liechti as Serviertochter  
 Mathilde Danegger as Frau Hofmann 
 Willi Ackermann 
 Lukas Ammann 
 Emil Gerber 
 Carlo Bertozza 
 Arnold Müdespacher

References

Bibliography 
 Bock, Hans-Michael & Bergfelder, Tim. The Concise Cinegraph: Encyclopaedia of German Cinema. Berghahn Books, 2009.

External links 
 

1939 films
1939 crime films
Swiss crime films
Swiss German-language films
Films directed by Leopold Lindtberg
Films based on Swiss novels
Police detective films
Swiss black-and-white films
1930s police films